This is a list of faculty and staff of Washington University in St. Louis.

Arts and Sciences

School of Medicine

National Academy of Medicine
John P. Atkinson, Samuel B. Grant Professor Professor of Medicine & Molecular Microbiology
C. Robert Cloninger, Wallace Renard Professor and Director, Center for Psychobiology of Personality
Graham Colditz, Niess-Gain Professor in Medicine Department of Surgery
Jerome R. Cox, Jr., Senior Professor, Computer Science & Engineering
William Henry Danforth, Chancellor
Timothy J. Eberlein, Bixby Professor and chairman, Department of Surgery
Alex S. Evers, Henry E. Mallinckrodt Professor and Chairman Department of Anesthesiology
Richard H. Gelberman, Fred C. Reynolds Professor and chair, Orthopaedic Surgery
Eric M. Genden, Excellence in Teaching Award, 1998
David M. Kipnis, Distinguished University Professor
Stuart A. Kornfeld, David C. and Betty Farrell Professor of Medicine and Biochemistry
Timothy J. Ley, Alan and Edith Wolff Professor of Medicine Professor of Genetics
Susan E. Mackinnon, Sydney M. Schoenberg, Jr. & Robert H. Schoenberg Professor and Chief, Division of Plastic and Reconstructive Surgery
Phillip W. Majerus, Professor of Medicine
Phillip Needleman
Colin Nichols, Carl Cori Endowed Professor
John W. Olney, Professor of Psychiatry and Neuropathology
William A. Peck, Alan A. and Edith L. Woolf Distinguished Professor Director, Center for Health Policy
Marcus E. Raichle, Professor of Radiology and Neurology
Lee N. Robins, University Professor of Social Science Emeritus
Alan L. Schwartz, Harriet B. Spoehrer Professor and chairman, Department of Pediatrics
Larry Jay Shapiro, Spencer T. and Ann W. Olin Distinguished Professor Executive Vice Chancellor for Medical Affairs
Emil R. Unanue, Department of Pathology, Paul and Ellen Lacy Professor of Pathology
Michael J. Welch, Professor of Radiology Division of Radiological Sciences
Samuel A. Wells

National Academy of Engineering

Bioengineering
2022: Farshid Guilak,  Mildred B. Simon Professor of Orthopaedic Surgery  and Biomedical Engineering 
2003: Yoram Rudy,  Fred Saigh Distinguished Professor of Engineering, and director,  Cardiac Bioelectricity and Arrhythmia Center

Computer Science and Engineering
2007: Jonathan S. Turner
Roch Guérin, Harold B. & Adelaide G. Welge Professor of Computer Science, and chair of the Computer Science & Engineering department.

Electric Power/Energy Systems Engineering
1984: John Zaborszky

Electronics Engineering
1991: Charles M. Wolfe

National Academy of Sciences

Anthropology
1988: Patty Jo Watson, Department of Anthropology, Edward Mallinckrodt Distinguished University Professor of Archaeology
1996: Erik Trinkaus, Department of Anthropology, Mary Tileston Hemenway Professor of Physical Anthropology

Biochemistry and Molecular Biophysics
1988: Carl Frieden, Department of Biochemistry and Molecular Biophysics, Alumni Endowed Professor and former department chair

Chemistry
1966: S.I. Weissman, Department of Chemistry

Evolutionary Biology
1999: Barbara A. Schaal, Department of Biology, first Female Vice President of the NAS

Immunology
1987: Emil R. Unanue, Department of Pathology, Paul and Ellen Lacy Professor of Pathology
2007: Wayne Yokoyama, winner of the Lee C. Howley Prize (for arthritis research), researched natural killer cells' role in immunology

Medical Genetics, Hematology, and Oncology
1982: Stuart Kornfeld, winner of the 2010 George M. Kober Medal from the Association of American Physicians
1986: Philip Majerus

Medical Physiology and Metabolism
1981: David Kipnis
2001: Jeffrey Gordon

Physics
1927: Arthur Holly Compton
1943: Lee A. DuBridge
1944: Edward Condon
1968: Henry Primakoff
1973: Robert M. Walker (geophysics)
1975: Eugene Feenberg
2004: Ramanath Cowsik
2007: Clifford Will

Physiology and Pharmacology
1987: Phillip Needleman

Psychology
1979: Ira Hirsh

Systems Neuroscience
1996: Marcus Raichle
1998: Nubuo Suga

Nobel Laureates

Chemistry
1970: Luis F. Leloir, Faculty of Medicine 1944
1980: Paul Berg, Faculty of Medicine 1954–1959
2004: Aaron Ciechanover, M.D., D.Sc., Research Distinguished Professor of Biochemistry at Technion-Israel Institute of Technology in Haifa, Israel and Visiting Professor of Pediatrics 1987-

Economic Science
1993: Douglass C. North (1920-2015), Faculty of Arts and Sciences, 1983-

Medicine & Physiology
1943: Edward A. Doisy (1893–1986), Faculty of Medicine, 1919–1923
1944: Joseph Erlanger (1874–1965), chairman, Department of Physiology 1910–1946
1944: Herbert Gasser (1888–1963), Faculty of Medicine, 1916–1931
1947: Carl F. Cori (1896–1984), Faculty of Medicine 1931–1984
1947: Gerty T. Cori (1896–1957), Faculty of Medicine 1931–1957
1959: Arthur Kornberg, chairman, Department of Microbiology, 1952–1959
1959: Severo Ochoa, Faculty of Medicine 1940–1942
1969: Alfred Hershey (1908–1997), Faculty of Medicine 1934–1950
1971: Earl Sutherland (1915–1974), M.D. 42, Resident in Internal Medicine 1943–1945, Faculty of Medicine, 1945–1953
1974: Christian de Duve, Faculty of Medicine 1946–1947
1978: Daniel Nathans (1928–1999), M.D. 54
1978: Hamilton O. Smith, Washington University Medical Service 1956–1957
1980: George D. Snell, Faculty of Arts and Sciences 1933–1934
1986: Stanley Cohen, Faculty of Arts and Sciences 1953–1959
1986: Rita Levi-Montalcini (1909-2012), Faculty of Arts and Sciences, 1948-
1992: Edwin G. Krebs, M.D. 43, Resident in Internal Medicine; Research Fellow in Biological Chemistry 1945–1948
1998: Robert F. Furchgott, Ph.D. Faculty of Medicine, 1949–1956.

Physics
1927:Arthur H. Compton (1892–1962), Faculty of Arts and Sciences 1920–1923 and 1945–1962, Chancellor 1945–1953

References 

Lists of people by university or college in Missouri
Faculty
Washington University in St. Louis faculty